Macalla madegassalis is a species of snout moth in the genus Macalla. It was described by Viette in 1960, and is known from Madagascar.

References

Moths described in 1960
Epipaschiinae
Moths of Madagascar
Moths of Africa